MWB, MwB, or mwb may mean:

People
Margaret Wander Bonanno, an American writer

Organizations
MWB Group Holdings, a property company
MalWareBytes software Made by Malwarebytes Corporation
Metropolitan Water Board, London
Mwb Broadcasting, owners of the KTMX radio station in York, Nebraska, USA
Musicians without Borders, global education and welfare organization
MyWikiBiz, a wiki directory 
Ministries Without Borders, an association of evangelical churches.
Morawa Airport, IATA airport code "MWB"

Terminology
In whaling, it may refer to a Marine Whaleboat or a Motor Whaleboat
In mechanics, it may refer to Medium-wheelbase or Mid-wheelbase
In management literature, it may refer to Must Win Battles, a way of defining and working on an organisations key goals for the year. 
Mwb seismic moment magnitude scale